The Economic Affairs Committee of the ECOSOCC deals with financial matters within Africa, like:

 Economic integration.
 Monetary and financial affairs.
 Private sector development, including the informal sector and resource mobilization.

The Chairperson of the Committee is Moses Tito Kachima

Sectoral Cluster Committees of the Economic, Social and Cultural Council